List of Guggenheim Fellowships awarded in 1982

1982 U.S. and Canadian Fellows

See also
Guggenheim Fellowship

References

1982
1982 awards